Donnie Orvin Nickey (born April 25, 1980) is a former American football safety. He played college football at Ohio State and was drafted by the Tennessee Titans in the fifth round of the 2003 NFL Draft.

Early years
Nickey attended Jonathan Alder High School in Plain City, Ohio, wore number 2, and was an All-Ohio running back. He also played free safety in football. In addition to his football talent, he was selected as an All-State center fielder as part of the 1998 OHSAA State Championship baseball team.

College career
Nickey was a co-captain with Mike Doss on the 2002 NCAA National Championship team.

Professional career

Nickey was drafted by the Tennessee Titans in the 5th round (19th pick) of the 2003 NFL Draft. He played his entire career with the Titans. Most of his time playing was on special teams, where he had been labeled as an 'Ace'. In 2010, while with the Titans, Nickey was ejected from a game against the San Diego Chargers after he shoved an official in the back during a retaliation with Chargers player Scott Mruczkowski. He was released by the Titans on July 25, 2011, after spending 8 seasons with the team.

Personal life
Nickey is married and currently lives in Dublin, Ohio. As of April 2017, he is entering his second year as varsity Head Coach of the Jackson-North Side Indians.

References

External links

Tennessee Titans biography

1980 births
Living people
Players of American football from Akron, Ohio
American football safeties
Ohio State Buckeyes football players
Tennessee Titans players
People from Plain City, Ohio
People from Jackson, Tennessee